Yefim Lvovich Dzigan (14 December 1898 – 31 December 1981) was a Soviet actor, film director and screenwriter. People's Artist of the USSR (1969).

Filmography

Director
 First Cornet Streshnev (1928, co-directed with Mikheil Chiaureli)
 The Sailors of Kronstadt (1936)
 If War Comes Tomorrow (1938)
 Jambyl (1952)
 Torrents of Steel (1967)

Awards
Two Orders of Lenin (1936 – for movie The Sailors of Kronstadt, 1978)
Stalin Prize, 2nd class (1941) – for movies The Sailors of Kronstadt and If War Comes Tomorrow
Honored Art Worker of the RSFSR (1958)
People's Artist of the RSFSR (1966)
Two Orders of the Red Banner of Labour (1967, 1973)
People's Artist of the USSR (1969)

References

External links
 

1898 births
1981 deaths
20th-century Russian male actors
Male actors from Moscow
Communist Party of the Soviet Union members
Academic staff of the Gerasimov Institute of Cinematography
People's Artists of the RSFSR
People's Artists of the USSR
Stalin Prize winners
Recipients of the Order of Lenin
Recipients of the Order of the Red Banner of Labour
Soviet film directors

Soviet military personnel of the Russian Civil War
Soviet screenwriters
Burials at Novodevichy Cemetery